"Senorita" is a song recorded by South Korean girl group (G)I-dle. It was released on February 26, 2019, as the title track from the group's second EP I Made (2019). A music video for the song was also released on February 26.

A Japanese version of the song was released on August 26, 2020, for their 2nd Japanese EP Oh My God.

Background
Soyeon worked with Carlos Gorito, a Brazilian TV personality, to express the "Spanish" part of the song in a strong way.

Composition
The lyrics were written by member Soyeon, who also served as producer alongside * Big Sancho.

Critical reception
Billboard described "Senorita" as a "Latin pop-themed dance track [that] incorporates castanets and jazzy brass horns alongside groovy rhythmic strings and sleek electronic effects". Lyrically, the women confidently relaying their emotions to a "Senor," who seemingly chants out the song's title in the post-chorus.

Commercial performance 
"Senorita" debuted at number 7 on the US World Digital Song Sales chart with 1,000 downloads and 782,000 streams in the week ending February 28. This was the group's fourth entry on the chart and the third as a group alone. The song debuted at number 30 on the Gaon Digital Chart and peaked at number 19 the following week. The song also tops Bugs and Naver Music's real-time chart. "Senorita" debuted at number 26 on Billboard Korea's Kpop Hot 100 and peaked at number 10 the following week.

Music video
On February 26, "Senorita" was released along with its music video. The video shows the group to a brightly-hued hotel full of danger, including razor blade-filled lollipops, dangling cranes, electrocution via hairdryer, and fires. The video’s release also marks the partnership between (G)I-dle and Memebox’s new Kaja cosmetic line. Throughout, the members of the act wear and interact with Kaja makeup products.

Accolades

Charts

Weekly charts

Monthly chart

Year-end charts

References

(G)I-dle songs
2019 singles
2019 songs
Cube Entertainment singles
Korean-language songs
Songs written by Jeon So-yeon